Hellmut Lantschner (11 November 1909 – 4 July 1993) was an Austrian and German alpine skier and world champion. He first competed for Austria, and from 1935 for Germany. He is the brother of Alpine skier and actor Gustav Lantschner.

Lantschner became a world champion in the downhill in 1939.

Filmography
 The Son of the White Mountain (1930)

References

1909 births
1993 deaths
German male alpine skiers
Austrian male alpine skiers
20th-century German people